The French ironclad Provence was the lead ship of her class of 10 armored frigates built for the French Navy during the 1860s. Commissioned in 1865, she spent the bulk of her career with the Mediterranean Squadron, often serving as a flagship. The ironclad played a minor role in the Franco-Prussian War of 1870–1871, blockading the North Sea coast of Prussia. Provence was decommissioned after the war, but was reactivated in late 1875.

She was assigned to the Eastern Mediterranean in early 1879 and became flagship of the Levant Naval Division later that year. The ship was condemned in 1886 and became a target ship until she was sold for scrap in 1893.

Design and description

The Provence class was designed as an enlarged version of the s with thicker armor, more powerful guns, and better seakeeping qualities. They displaced . Their crew numbered 579–594 officers and enlisted men.

Provence had a single two-cylinder horizontal-return connecting-rod compound steam engine that drove the propeller shaft, using steam provided by eight boilers.

Armament and protection
By 1869–1870, Provence had been equipped with eight  Modèle 1864 RMLs and four 194 mm Modèle 1864 weapons serving as chase guns.

The conning tower's sides consisted of  armor plates.

Construction and service
Provence, named after the historic province, was ordered on 16 November 1860 from the Arsenal de Toulon, laid down in March 1861 and launched on 29 October 1863. She was commissioned for trials on 25 February 1864 and was completed the following month, although the frigate was not definitively commissioned until 1 February 1865. Provence was assigned to the Squadron of Evolutions of the Mediterranean Squadron. In May the ship escorted Emperor Napoleon III during an official visit to French Algeria. The Mediterranean Squadron sailed to Brest in August to rendezvous with the Northern Squadron for maneuvers. Before they began, however, the Mediterranean Squadron hosted a visit by the British Channel Fleet on 21–24 August. The combined squadrons visited Portsmouth a few days later and remained until 2 September, their crews visiting the dockyard, each other's ships and participating in multiple balls and banquets. Provence was present when a statue of Vice Admiral Pierre André de Suffren was unveiled at Saint-Tropez on 4 April 1866. During the Third Italian War of Independence later that year, she ferried General Edmond Le Bœuf throughout the Adriatic Sea from 16 July to 20 October. The ship became the flagship of Rear Admiral Louis Pierre Alexis Pothuau in March 1868.

When the Franco-Prussian War began on 19 July 1870, the French had lost track of a squadron of four Prussian ironclads so the Mediterranean Squadron was deployed to Oran, French Algeria, to intercept them in case they attempted to interdict the troop convoys between French North Africa and Metropolitan France. When they received word that the Prussian ships had returned to Germany, the squadron sailed to Brest to prepare to blockade the coast of Prussia. Provence was assigned to Vice Admiral Léon Martin Fourichon's squadron that was tasked to blockade German ports in the Heligoland Bight. It departed Brest on 8 August and arrived off the British-owned island of Heligoland three days later. The neutral British denied the French permission to re-coal there and the ships were forced to perform it at sea under dangerous conditions. Bad weather and a series of storms beginning in late August prevented the squadron from coaling and the ships were forced to return to France in early September. By then the Prussians were besieging Paris and many of the trained gunners aboard the squadron were transferred to defend the city. The squadron resumed the blockade with reduced crews until December when smaller ships took it over.

Provence was paid off on 5 April 1871 and disarmed later that month although she was used from trials 18 March 1872 – 1873 before being reduced to reserve the following year. The ship was rearmed and recommissioned on 7 December 1875; she was assigned to the First Division of the Squadron of Evolutions in 1876–1878. On 17 January 1879 Provence became the flagship of Rear Admiral Laurent Joseph Lejeune and was detached to the Eastern Mediterranean. The ship was became the flagship of Rear Admiral Léopold de Pritzbuer, commander of the Levant Naval Division on 3 June. Rear Admiral Alfred Conrad relieved de Pritzbuer on 1 August 1881. Provence was condemned on 3 May 1886 and was hulked for use as a target. The ship was sold for scrap on 10 November 1893 and broken up in Toulon.

Citations

Bibliography

 

1863 ships
Provence-class ironclads
Ships built in France